The 2018 FIVB Volleyball Men's Nations League was the inaugural edition of the FIVB Volleyball Men's Nations League, a new annual international men's volleyball tournament contested by 16 national teams that replaced the former World League in the international calendar. The competition was held between May and July 2018, and the final round took place in the Stade Pierre-Mauroy, Villeneuve-d'Ascq, Lille metropolitan area, France.

South Korea were the last placed challenger team after the preliminary round and were replaced by 2018 Challenger Cup winners Portugal in the 2019 edition.

Russia won the inaugural edition, defeating the home team in straight sets in the final. Both teams contesting the final had previously won the World League – Russia on three opportunities and France on two. United States, which also had won the World League twice, defeated the reigning Olympic champions and 9-time World League winners Brazil in straight sets for the bronze medal. Maxim Mikhaylov from Russia, who was the World League MVP in 2011, was elected the Most valuable player.

Qualification
Sixteen teams qualified for the competition. Twelve of them qualified as core teams which cannot face relegation. Other four teams were selected as challenger teams which could be relegated from the tournament.

Format

Preliminary round
The 16 teams compete in a round-robin format with every core team hosting a pool at least once. The teams are divided into 4 pools of 4 teams at each week and compete five weeks long, for 120 matches. The top five teams after the preliminary round join the hosts of the final round to compete in the final round. The relegation takes into consideration only the 4 challenger teams. The last ranked challenger team will be excluded from the 2019 Nations League. The winners of the 2018 Challenger Cup will qualify for the next edition as a challenger team.

Final round
The six qualified teams play in 2 pools of 3 teams in round-robin. The top 2 teams of each pool qualify for the semifinals. The pool winners play against the runners-up in this round. The semifinals winners advance to compete for the Nations League title. The losers face each other in the third place match.

Pools composition
The overview of pools was released on February 16, 2018.

Preliminary round

Final round

Venues
The list of host cities and venues was announced on 16 February 2018.

Preliminary round

Final round

Competition schedule

Pool standing procedure
 Total number of victories (matches won, matches lost)
 In the event of a tie, the following first tiebreaker will apply: The teams will be ranked by the most points gained per match as follows:
Match won 3–0 or 3–1: 3 points for the winner, 0 points for the loser
Match won 3–2: 2 points for the winner, 1 point for the loser
Match forfeited: 3 points for the winner, 0 points (0–25, 0–25, 0–25) for the loser
 If teams are still tied after examining the number of victories and points gained, then the FIVB will examine the results in order to break the tie in the following order:
Sets quotient: if two or more teams are tied on the number of points gained, they will be ranked by the quotient resulting from the division of the number of all sets won by the number of all sets lost.
Points quotient: if the tie persists based on the sets quotient, the teams will be ranked by the quotient resulting from the division of all points scored by the total of points lost during all sets.
If the tie persists based on the points quotient, the tie will be broken based on the team that won the match of the Round Robin Phase between the tied teams. When the tie in points quotient is between three or more teams, these teams ranked taking into consideration only the matches involving the teams in question.

Squads

The 16 national teams involved in the tournament were required to register a squad of 21 players, which every week's 14-player roster must be selected from. Each country must declare its 14-player roster two days before the start of each week's round-robin competition.

Preliminary round

Ranking

 
|}
Source: VNL 2018 standings

Week 1

Pool 1
All times are Central European Summer Time (UTC+02:00).
|}

Pool 2
All times are China Standard Time (UTC+08:00).
|}

Pool 3
All times are Central European Summer Time (UTC+02:00).
|}

Pool 4
All times are Central European Summer Time (UTC+02:00).
|}

Week 2

Pool 5
All times are Eastern European Summer Time (UTC+03:00).
|}

Pool 6
All times are Brasília Time (UTC−03:00).
|}

Pool 7
All times are Argentina Time (UTC−03:00).
|}

Pool 8
All times are Central European Summer Time (UTC+02:00).
|}

Week 3

Pool 9
All times are Eastern Daylight Time (UTC−04:00).
|}

Pool 10
All times are Japan Standard Time (UTC+09:00).
|}

Pool 11
All times are Yekaterinburg Time (UTC+05:00).
|}

Pool 12
All times are Central European Summer Time (UTC+02:00).
|}

Week 4

Pool 13
All times are Korea Standard Time (UTC+09:00).
|}

Pool 14
All times are Central European Summer Time (UTC+02:00).
|}

Pool 15
All times are Central Daylight Time (UTC−05:00).
|}

Pool 16
All times are Eastern European Summer Time (UTC+03:00).
|}

Week 5

Pool 17
All times are Australian Eastern Standard Time (UTC+10:00).
|}

Pool 18
All times are China Standard Time (UTC+08:00).
|}

Pool 19
All times are Iran Daylight Time (UTC+04:30).
|}

Pool 20
All times are Central European Summer Time (UTC+02:00).
|}

Final round
All times are Central European Summer Time (UTC+02:00).

Pool play

Pool A

|}

|}

Pool B

|}

|}

Final four

Semifinals
|}

3rd place match
|}

Final
|}

Final standing

Source: VNL 2018 final standings

Awards

Most Valuable Player

Best Setter

Best Outside Spikers

Best Middle Blockers

Best Opposite Spiker

Best Libero

Statistics leaders

Preliminary round

Final round

See also
2018 FIVB Volleyball Women's Nations League
2018 FIVB Volleyball Men's Challenger Cup
2018 FIVB Volleyball Women's Challenger Cup

References

External links
Fédération Internationale de Volleyball – official website
FIVB Volleyball Nations League 2018 – official website

2018
FIVB
Nations League, Men, 2018
2018 in French sport
May 2018 sports events in France
June 2018 sports events in France
July 2018 sports events in France
Sport in Lille
May 2018 sports events in China
May 2018 sports events in Poland
May 2018 sports events in Europe
June 2018 sports events in South America
June 2018 sports events in Russia
June 2018 sports events in Japan
June 2018 sports events in Canada
June 2018 sports events in Asia
June 2018 sports events in Germany
June 2018 sports events in Iran
June 2018 sports events in Italy
June 2018 sports events in China
Volleyball competitions in Iran
Volleyball competitions in France
Volleyball competitions in Poland
Volleyball competitions in Canada
Volleyball competitions in Italy
Volleyball competitions in Germany
Volleyball competitions in China
Volleyball competitions in Russia
Volleyball competitions in Argentina
Volleyball competitions in Brazil
Volleyball competitions in Japan